The 2003–04 season was Reading's second consecutive season in the First Division, after promotion from the Second Division in 2002.

Squad

Left club during season

Transfers

In

Loan in

Out

Released

Competitions

Overview

First Division

Results summary

Results

League table

League Cup

FA Cup

Squad statistics

Appearances and goals

|-
|colspan="14"|Players who appeared for Reading but left during the season:

|}

Goal scorers

Clean sheets

Disciplinary record

References

Reading F.C. seasons
Reading

zh:雷丁2010年至2011年球季